Orsolya Herr (born 23 November 1984) is a former Hungarian handball goalkeeper.

Career

Club
Started to play at the age of 12, she was first selected for her hometown club Tatabányai TSC. Two years later she was signed by Hungarian giants Győri ETO KC and got an excellent opportunity to train on one of the best academies in the country.

She debuted in the Hungarian championship in 2001, but her playing minutes remained limited in the forthcoming years and she was eventually loaned to Budapest Kőbányai Spartacus SC for the 2003–2004 season. After her comeback she slowly established herself as a regular, and on 23 March 2005 she won her first cap for the national team as well, when Hungary hosted Slovakia.

Her contract in Győr ran out in summer 2009 and she decided not to extend it. She joined Podravka Koprivnica instead, as a replacement of Paula Ungureanu, who signed to CS Oltchim Râmnicu Vâlcea. In Croatia she got the chance to play together with national teammate Anita Bulath and former Győr player Ana Ðokić, under the guidance of world-class coach Zdravko Zovko.

However, just few months after her move to Koprivnica, financial troubles were revealed and on 4 August the club announced that they release all their foreign players with immediate effect to axe the wage bills.

She has not been a free agent for too long, just two weeks after her dismissal she signed a deal with Vác. Herr told in an interview, that right after the official statement made by Podravka she got many calls and offers, and she had nothing else to do just choose the best one. In the summer of 2011 she moved to ambitious Siófok KC along with other three Hungarian internationals, Szilvia Ábrahám, Bernadett Bódi and Renáta Mörtel. However, just after one season she signed to her former club Győri ETO as a replacement of the retiring Katalin Pálinger.

International
Herr debuted in the national team in 2005 and a year later she already took part on her first European Championship, finishing fifth. She participated on further two European Championships (2008, 2010) as well as two World Championships (2007, 2009). She was also present on the 2008 Summer Olympics, where Hungary placed fourth.

Personal
One of her two sisters, Anita, is also a Hungarian international handballer, playing in the right back position. They played together in Győr until 2009, and both of them were wanted by Podravka, but Anita finally moved to Germany. In 2012 they reunited in Siófok KC for a brief period, following Anita left her club, VfL Sindelfingen, which went to bankruptcy, and joined the Balaton-side team.

Achievements
Nemzeti Bajnokság I:
Winner: 2005, 2006, 2008, 2009, 2013, 2014
Silver Medallsit: 2007, 2015
Bronze Medallist: 2003, 2010
Magyar Kupa:
Winner: 2005, 2006, 2007, 2008, 2009, 2013, 2014, 2015
EHF Champions League:
Winner: 2013, 2014
Finalist: 2009
Semifinalist: 2007, 2008
EHF Cup Winners' Cup:
Finalist: 2006
EHF Cup:
Finalist: 2003, 2005
Junior European Championship:
Silver Medallist: 2002
Junior World Championship:
Silver Medallist: 2003
European Championship:
Bronze Medalist: 2012

References

External links

 Career statistics at Worldhandball

1984 births
Living people
People from Tatabánya
Hungarian female handball players
Győri Audi ETO KC players
Sportspeople from Komárom-Esztergom County